Cold liquor tanks, cold water tanks as they called in the brewery. Cold liquor tank is a buffer vessel and it carries cold water that will be used to cool the bitter wort down to a fermentable temperature field after boiling.

Two stage heat exchanger 

The first stage is ground water and it running back to HLT to next sparge. Glycol serves as a secondary cooling system and its back to glycol container. Valves on both channels, and a temp exploration right after the heat exchanger. Heats up your water for your next brew without using any extra power, reuses your water you would use from a CLT, and saves you the space of a whole tank.

Primary purpose of the CLT’s 

Cold liquor tanks are used for brewing process and CLT's also called buffer tanks. Buffer tanks contain cold water used for the purpose of cooling the bitter wort temperature down to the fermentable level range after boiling. This process is done by wort cooler.

Temperature 

The cold storage tank that been a single skin vessel and should be in a room which requires cold temperature. Cold liquid tanks connected with glycol chiller tanks and its impressed inside water.
Frequency level of the cooling capacity of the beer helps to recommend the appropriate volume and cooling methods. It can contain 1000+ litre and when water can be passed through the heat exchanger and when it run hot liquid tank temperature near about 70 to 80-degree Celsius. It's a typical process and its help continuous brewing without any break and no need waiting for gain actual temperature.

Features of cold liquor tanks 

 12 Gauge 304L Stainless Steel Construction
 Double Walled and Insulated
 1 1/2" Polyurethane Lining
 Internal Welds Ground to a Healthful Food Grade Finish
 Exterior Polished to #4 Brushed Finish
 Flat Bottom with 1 1/2" TC Center Drain
 Dome Top with 18" Round Manway
 1 1/2" TC Water Inlet Port
 1 1/2" TC Water Return Port
 1 1/2" TC Temperature Port
 Removable Level Gauge
 Water Re-Circulation Assembly

Sizes of CLT’s 

There are several sizes of CLT's  and HLT's  for commercial use purpose but the size of the tanks totally depends on the production and brewing system with water at the quantity and temperature needed. 2.5x  is the proper size of CLT's.SW = Single Wall,J/I = Jacketed and Insulated,
 4 bbl (SW) (J/I)
 5 bbl (SW) (J/I)
 7 bbl (SW) (J/I)
 10 bbl (SW) (J/I)
 15 bbl (J/I)
 20 bbl (J/I)
 30 bbl (J/I)

Automation of the CLT’s 

All tanks remain consistent with stainless steel piping and automated valves the brewer can only recirculate, radiation or pass it to the brewhouse without transmitting the platform.  Put the tanks in “auto” mode and they are at temp when they hit the brewery!

See also 
 Glycol Chillers
 Brewing

References

Brewing
Brewing ingredients